The Zhuk-class patrol boat, also known as Project 1400M "Grif", is a small border patrol vessel of less than 40 ton displacement built in the Soviet Union and later in Ukraine. Over 300 boats were built between 1969 and 1991. Out of those, 110 were sold to 23 other countries. 
Exact numbers are unknown, but they were widely exported by the Soviet Union in addition to use in home waters as harbor patrol. The vessels were excellent for this task thanks to a cheap design for mass production. With only a single simple radar unit and manually-aimed machine guns, they made ideal patrol boats. The dissolution of the Soviet Union in 1991, and the abolition of its primary user the, KGB Maritime Guard, it was taken over by the Russian Federal Coast Guard. By 2007 only 15-20 remained in service with the Russian Navy.

Models
 1400
 1400A
 1400E (created in 1972)
 1400M
 1400T, one was specially built in 2004 for Turkmenistan
 1400ME (created in 1976)

Operators

Former Soviet Union
 Russian Coast Guard - 25 vessels (Pr.1400) were part of two border guard brigades (6th Patrol Boats Brigade in Ochamchira and 21st Patrol Boats Brigade in Novorossiysk); 4 vessels (Pr.1400ME) were part of a training cutters group (also known as GUK) that was based in Ochamchira, but training was conducted in Poti; 2 vessels (Pr.1400A) were part of government vessels division and based in Sochi
 (non-UN member) received 8 vessels total, 2 were received in 1992-93 and involved in the 1992-93 war in Abkhazia their armament was replaced with 1x2-23 mm ZU-23-2 and 1-2 blocks of S-8 rocket (80 mm by 20 pieces per block); those two were involved in the Sukhumi Airport blockade and known to shotdown military and civilian airplanes of Georgia (at least one Su-25, one Tu-134 and two Tu-154) with time those two were scrapped; in 2004 received 3 vessels of Russian GUKs from the 6th Patrol Boats Brigade and in 2006 were received 3 more vessels
 Ukrainian sea guard - 7 vessels of the 5th Patrol Boat Brigade in Balaklava (Pr.1400 - 2, Pr.1400M - 3), 15 vessels of the 18th Patrol Boat Brigade in Odessa (Pr.1400M - 15); Ukrainian Navy - 2 vessels; about 10 more vessels were built after fall of the Soviet Union at More Factory in Feodosiya
 Azerbaijani Navy - one vessel from the Caspian Flotilla

 Estonian Navy - Two examples left behind by the Soviets (both Pr.1400M) when they left the Baltic States, two Zhuks were formally commissioned in 1992. They were scrapped sometime in 2001 and replaced by Swedish- and Finnish-built vessels. One of them (EML Grif) is on exhibition at the Lennusadam port of the Estonian Maritime Museum.
:

Other than former Soviet Union countries
 Military of Algeria - One (Pr.1400ME) example was procured in 1981.  It was quickly discarded.
 Navy of Benin - As of 2004, all four examples were "in commission" but non-operational.
 Royal Cambodian Navy - In 1975 three units had been transferred from the Soviet Union. In 1988 a fourth example was returned by Vietnam.  Used for riverine patrol, they are active.
 Coast Guard - Three units transferred, all non-operational as of 2014.
 DRC Navy - Three units were transferred by the USSR in 1982 with three more ordered in 1984.  None are operational.
 Cuban Navy - Between 1971 and 1989 40 units were transferred to Cuba.  By 2007 only a dozen remained in service.
 Military of Equatorial Guinea - By 1975 three units had been transferred from the Soviet Navy where they served until begin scrapped in 1988–89.
 Ethiopian Navy - Four Zhuks were transferred in two batches between 1982 and 1990. Two fled to Yemen during the Yemeni civil war, when the other two examples were destroyed by rebels. They were scrapped in 1995.
 Military of Guinea - After extensive refurbishment, two units were transferred from the USSR to Guinea in 1987 and remain marginally operational.
 Iraqi Navy - Five Zhuks were transferred by 1975.  Relegated to security tasks during the Iran-Iraq War from 1980–88, they took part in the 1990 attack on Kuwait City.  During Operation Desert Storm three were sunk by Coalition aircraft, with the remaining two sunk in 2003 by US planes as part of Operation Iraqi Freedom.
 Military of Mauritius - With the collapse of the Soviet Union in 1990, two ex-Soviet units were given to Mauritius in 1990.  The Rescuer and Retriever have been carefully cared for and by 2007 were in excellent condition and operational.  They have been upgraded with a new radar and civilian GPS receivers.
 Armed Forces for the Defense of Mozambique - Two of five units delivered between 1978 and 1980 were sunk during the civil war.  The remainder were decommissioned in 1993.
 Nicaraguan Navy - With eight units transferred by 1986, two more were given by the USSR as replacements for two lost during a 1989 hurricane.  All but one were removed from service by 2000, with one remaining in service, the GC301 "Río Segovia" as of 2014.
 Seychelles People's Defence Force - Supplied by the USSR in 1982, two vessels remain operational with their "Spin Trough" radar replaced by a different system.
 Somali Navy - One example was transferred, sunk in the civil war of 1991.
 Syrian Navy - Home ported at Tartous, eight units were transferred from 1981–88.  They remain operational.
 Vietnam People's Navy - Between 1978 and 1990, a total of fourteen units were transferred.  One example was transferred to Cambodia, and three decommissioned in 1993.  By 2007 the remainder had been decommissioned.
 Yemeni Navy - Following the unification of North and South Yemen, a total of seven examples were in Yemeni possession.  Four were modified with the addition of Decca 1226 radar systems.  By 2006, the Zhuks were replaced by new, purpose-built patrol boats from Australia.

References

External links
 Project 1400 patrol boat 
 Project 1400M Grif | Spets Techno Export
 Complete Ship List of all Zhuk class patrol boats

Patrol vessels of the Soviet Navy
Patrol vessels of the Ukrainian Navy
Patrol vessels of the Georgian Navy